Saraaine El Tahta     (also spelled Sareen, Serraine El Tahta, Saraain El Tahta) is a village in the Baalbek-Hermel Governorate in eastern Lebanon. Its inhabitants are Christians.

The Church of Saint Georges in Saraaine was destroyed during the war in 1976. Under the auspices of Bishop Al-Hashem, the  Bishop of Baalbeck, and the patronage of Ms. Manell P. Brice, a member of the Editorial Board of the Journal of Maronite Studies, the rebuilding of the church began in 1999. There are five churches in Saraaine El Tahta: Saint Elias (Maronite Church), Saint Challita (Maronite Church), Saint Georges (Maronite Church), Saint Elias (Catholic Orthodox Church) and The Shrine of Our Lady of Birth.

References

External links
 Serraine Et Tahta, Localiban 

Populated places in Baalbek District
Maronite Christian communities in Lebanon
Melkite Christian communities in Lebanon